Group A of the 2023 FIFA Women's World Cup will take place from 20 to 30 July 2023. The group consists of hosts New Zealand, Norway, the Philippines and Switzerland. The top two teams will advance to the round of 16.

Teams

Notes

Standings

In the round of 16:
 The winners of Group A will advance to play the runners-up of Group C.
 The runners-up of Group A will advance to play the winners of Group C.

Matches
All times listed are local, NZST (UTC+12).

New Zealand vs Norway

Philippines vs Switzerland

New Zealand vs Philippines

Switzerland vs Norway

Switzerland vs New Zealand

Norway vs Philippines

Discipline
Fair play points will be used as tiebreakers in the group if the overall and head-to-head records of teams are tied. These are calculated based on yellow and red cards received in all group matches as follows:
first yellow card: minus 1 point;
indirect red card (second yellow card): minus 3 points;
direct red card: minus 4 points;
yellow card and direct red card: minus 5 points;

Only one of the above deductions will be applied to a player in a single match.

References

External links
 

2023 FIFA Women's World Cup